The world's first long-distance telephone line, established in 1877, connected French Corral with Bowman Lake (previously known as French Lake) at the headwaters of the Yuba River.
Graniteville, and Milton.  

The line was operated by the Ridge Telephone Company for the service of Milton Mining and Water Company, as well as other water companies.  The line was an improvement over the system used in nearby Downieville, California.

Historical landmark
The site is now a California Historical Landmark.  The marker is inscribed:
WORLD'S FIRST LONG-DISTANCE TELEPHONE LINE
The first long-distance telephone in the world, built in 1877 by the Ridge Telephone Company, connected French Corral with French Lake, 58 miles away. It was operated by the Milton Mining Company from a building on this site that had been erected about 1853.

See also

California Historical Landmarks in Nevada County

References

See also
 History of the telephone
 Timeline of the telephone

1877 establishments in California
History of Nevada County, California
California Historical Landmarks
California Gold Rush
History of the telephone
History of telecommunications in the United States